Mar'ivka (Russian:Марьевка, Ukrainian:Марьевка, is a village in the district of Lenine Raion in Crimea.

Georgraphy 
Mar'ivka  is located in the south of the district, west of Zavitne, east of the Uzunlarske Lake.

References 

Populated coastal places in Ukraine